Many planets within the Solar System have been considered for colonization and terraforming. The main candidates for colonization in the inner Solar System are Mars and Venus. Other possible candidates for colonization include the Moon and even Mercury.

Many parts of the outer Solar System have been considered for possible future colonization. Most of the larger moons of the outer planets contain water ice, liquid water, and organic compounds that might be useful for sustaining human life.

There have also been proposals to place robotic aerostats in the upper atmospheres of the Solar System's gas giant planets for exploration and possibly mining of helium-3, which could have a very high value per unit mass as a thermonuclear fuel.

Candidate locations

Moon 

A number of government space agencies such as Russia (2014), China (2012) and the US have periodically floated lunar plans for constructing the first lunar outpost.

The European Space Agency (ESA) head Jan Woerner has proposed cooperation among countries and companies on lunar capabilities, a concept referred to as Moon Village.

In a December 2017 directive, the Trump Administration steered NASA to include a lunar mission on the pathway to other beyond Earth orbit (BEO) destinations.

In a May 2018 interview, Blue Origin CEO Jeff Bezos indicated Blue Origin would build and fly the Blue Moon lunar lander on its own, with private funding, but that they would build it a lot faster, and accomplish more, if it were done in a partnership with existing government space agencies. Bezos specifically mentioned the December 2017 NASA direction and the ESA Moon Village concepts.

Mars 

The hypothetical colonization of Mars has received interest from public space agencies and private corporations and has received extensive treatment in science fiction writing, film, and art.

The most recent commitments to researching permanent settlement include those by public space agencies—NASA, ESA, Roscosmos, ISRO , and the CNSA—and private organizations—SpaceX, Lockheed Martin, and Boeing.

Venus 

The colonization of Venus has been a subject of many works of science fiction since before the dawn of spaceflight and is still discussed from both a fictional and a scientific standpoint. Proposals for Venus are focused on colonies floating in the upper-middle atmosphere and on terraforming. 

 
In addition to the aerostats that can be used on Earth, of all known planets and moons in the Solar system, only the Venusian atmosphere has a Lana Coefficient that allows for the use of vacuum airships made of some composites (that will work up to an altitude of 15 km) and graphene (up to an altitude of 40 km). This could mean that Venus is safer to colonize than Mars.

With discoveries as of 2020 traces of possibly indigenous life in the atmosphere of Venus, attempts of any humanization of Venus have become an increased issue of planetary protection, since uncontrolled effects of human presence might endanger such life.

Mercury 

Once thought to be a volatile depleted body like the Moon, Mercury is now known to be richer in minerals than any other terrestrial body in the inner solar system.  The planet also receives almost seven times the solar flux as the Earth/Moon system.

Mercury is an ideal place (according to geologist Stephen Gillett, who suggested in 1996) to build and launch solar sail spacecraft, which could theoretically launch as folded up, by a mass driver from Mercury's surface.  This could also make Mercury an ideal place to acquire materials useful in building hardware to send to (and terraform) Venus.

As Mercury has essentially no axial tilt, crater floors near its poles lie in eternal darkness, never seeing the Sun.  They function as cold traps, trapping volatiles for geological periods. It is estimated that the poles of Mercury contain 1014–1015 kg of water, likely covered by about 5.65×109 m3 of hydrocarbons. This would make agriculture possible. It has been suggested that plant varieties could be developed to take advantage of the high light intensity and the long day of Mercury. The poles do not experience the significant day-night variations the rest of Mercury does, making them the best place on the planet to begin a colony.

Asteroids 

Asteroids, including those in the asteroid belt, have been suggested as a possible site of human colonization. Some of the driving forces behind this effort to colonize asteroids include the survival of humanity, as well as economic incentives associated with asteroid mining.

The Jovian System
 

The Jovian system in general has particular disadvantages for colonization, including a deep gravity well.  The magnetosphere of Jupiter bombards the moons of Jupiter with intense ionizing radiation  delivering about 36 Sv per day to unshielded colonists on Io and about 5.40 Sv per day on Europa.  Exposure to about 0.75 Sv over a few days is enough to cause radiation poisoning, and about 5 Sv over a few days is fatal.

Jupiter itself, like the other gas giants, has further disadvantages.  There is no accessible surface on which to land, and the light hydrogen atmosphere would not provide good buoyancy for some kind of aerial habitat as has been proposed for Venus.

Io
Io is not ideal for colonization, due to its hostile environment. The moon is under influence of high tidal forces, causing high volcanic activity. Jupiter's strong radiation belt overshadows Io, delivering 36 Sv a day to the moon. The moon is also extremely dry. Io is the least ideal place for the colonization of the four Galilean moons.
Despite this, its volcanoes could be energy resources for the other moons, which are better suited to colonization.

Europa

The Artemis Project proposed a plan to colonize Europa. Scientists would inhabit igloos and drill down into the Europan ice crust, exploring any subsurface ocean. The report also discusses the use of air pockets for human habitation.

Ganymede
Ganymede is the largest moon in the Solar System. Ganymede is the only moon with a magnetosphere, albeit overshadowed by Jupiter's magnetic field. Because of this magnetic field, Ganymede is one of only two Jovian moons where surface settlements would be feasible because it receives about 0.08 Sv of radiation per day. Ganymede could be terraformed.

Callisto
Due to its distance from Jupiter's powerful radiation belt, Callisto is subject to only 0.0001 Sv a day. When NASA carried out a study called HOPE (Revolutionary Concepts for Human Outer Planet Exploration) regarding the future exploration of the Solar System, the target chosen was Callisto. It might be possible to build a surface base that would produce fuel for further exploration of the Solar System.

Jupiter trojans
The Keck Observatory announced in 2006 that the binary Jupiter trojan 617 Patroclus, and possibly many other Jupiter trojans, are likely composed of water ice, with a layer of dust. This suggests that mining water and other volatiles in this region and transporting them elsewhere in the Solar System, perhaps via the proposed Interplanetary Transport Network, may be feasible in the not-so-distant future. This could make colonization of the Moon, Mercury and main-belt asteroids more practical.

The Saturnian System
Robert Zubrin identified Saturn, Uranus and Neptune as "the Persian Gulf of the Solar System", as the largest sources of deuterium and helium-3 to drive a fusion economy, with Saturn the most important and most valuable of the three, because of its relative proximity, low radiation, and large system of moons. On the other hand, planetary scientist John Lewis in his 1997 book Mining the Sky, insists that Uranus is the likeliest place to mine helium-3 because of its significantly shallower gravity well, which makes it easier for a laden tanker spacecraft to thrust itself out. Furthermore, Uranus is an Ice giant, which would likely make it easier to separate the helium out of the atmosphere.

Titan
 

Zubrin identified Titan as possessing an abundance of all the elements necessary to support life, making Titan perhaps the most advantageous locale in the outer Solar System for colonization. He said, "In certain ways, Titan is the most hospitable extraterrestrial world within the Solar System for human colonization." A widely published expert on terraforming, Christopher McKay, is also a co-investigator on the Huygens probe that landed on Titan in January 2005.

The surface of Titan is mostly uncratered and thus inferred to be very young and active, and probably composed of mostly water ice, and lakes of liquid hydrocarbons (methane/ethane) in its polar regions. While the temperature is cryogenic (95 K) it should be able to support a base, but more information regarding Titan's surface and the activities on it is necessary. The thick atmosphere and the weather, such as potential flash floods, are also factors to consider.

Enceladus
On 9 March 2006, NASA's Cassini space probe found possible evidence of liquid water on Enceladus. According to that article, "pockets of liquid water may be no more than tens of meters below the surface." These findings were confirmed in 2014 by NASA. This means liquid water could be collected much more easily and safely on Enceladus than, for instance, on Europa (see above). Discovery of water, especially liquid water, generally makes a celestial body a much more likely candidate for colonization. An alternative model of Enceladus's activity is the decomposition of methane/water clathrates – a process requiring lower temperatures than liquid water eruptions. The higher density of Enceladus indicates a larger than Saturnian average silicate core that could provide materials for base operations.

Uranus
Because Uranus has the lowest escape velocity of the four gas giants, it  has been proposed as a mining site for helium-3. If human supervision of the robotic activity proved necessary, one of Uranus's natural satellites might serve as a base.

Neptune
It is hypothesized that one of Neptune's satellites could  be used for colonization. Triton's surface shows signs of extensive geological activity that implies a subsurface ocean, perhaps composed of ammonia/water. If technology advanced to the point that tapping such geothermal energy was possible, it could make colonizing a cryogenic world like Triton feasible, supplemented by nuclear fusion power.

Kuiper belt and Oort cloud

The noted physicist Freeman Dyson identified comets, rather than planets, as the major potential habitat of life in space. Several hundred billion to trillion comet-like ice-rich bodies exist outside the orbit of Neptune, in the Kuiper belt and Inner and Outer Oort cloud. These may contain all the ingredients for life (water ice, ammonia, and carbon-rich compounds), including significant amounts of deuterium and helium-3. Since Dyson's proposal, the number of trans-Neptunian objects known has increased greatly.

Colonists could live in the dwarf planet's icy crust or mantle, using fusion or geothermal heat[citation needed] and mining the soft-ice or liquid inner ocean for volatiles and minerals. Given the light gravity and resulting lower pressure in the ice mantle or inner ocean, colonizing the rocky core's outer surface might give colonists the largest number of mineral and volatile resources as well as insulating them from cold.[citation needed] Surface habitats or domes are another possibility, as background radiation levels are likely to be low.

Difficulties

There would be many problems in colonizing the outer Solar System. These include:
Distance from Earth: The outer planets are much farther from Earth than the inner planets, and would therefore be harder and more time-consuming to reach. In addition, return voyages may well be prohibitive considering the time and distance.
Extreme cold: temperatures are near absolute zero in many parts of the outer Solar System.
Power: Solar power is many times less concentrated in the outer Solar System than in the inner Solar System. It is unclear as to whether it would be usable there, using some form of concentration mirrors, or whether nuclear power would be necessary. There have also been proposals to use the gravitational potential energy of planets or dwarf planets with moons.
Effects of low gravity on the human body: All moons of the gas giants and all outer dwarf planets have a very low gravity, the highest being Io's gravity (0.183 g) which is less than 1/5 of the Earth's gravity. Since the Apollo program all crewed spaceflight has been constrained to Low Earth orbit and there has been no opportunity to test the effects of such low gravitational accelerations on the human body. It is speculated that the low gravity environments might have very similar effects to long-term exposure in weightlessness. Such effects can be avoided by rotating spacecraft creating artificial gravity.

See also 

 O'Neill cylinder
 Space colonization
 Asteroid mining
 Lagrange point colonization
 Colonisation (biology)

References 

Space colonization
Solar System